Tano Dumasi is a town in Atwima Mponua District, Ashanti Region, Ghana.  It is located at an elevation of 299 meters above sea level and its population amounts to 114,989.

Tano Odumase is also known as Odumase, Odumasi, Tano Odumase.

Notable sons
 Isaac Kwame Asiamah - Ghanaian politician

References

Populated places in the Ashanti Region